Marie Eugène François Thomas Dubois (28 January 1858 – 16 December 1940) was a Dutch paleoanthropologist and geologist. He earned worldwide fame for his discovery of Pithecanthropus erectus (later redesignated Homo erectus), or "Java Man". Although hominid fossils had been found and studied before, Dubois was the first anthropologist to embark upon a purposeful search for them.

Life and work 

MEFT. Dubois was born and raised in the village of Eijsden, Limburg, where his father, Jean Joseph Balthazar Dubois, an immigrant from Thimister-Clermont, Liège, Belgium, was an apothecary, later the mayor. Interested in all phenomena of the world of nature, Eugène explored the "caves" ("grotten", actually underground limestone mines) of Mount Saint Peter and amassed collections of plant parts, stones, insects, shells, and animal skulls. From age 12-13 on, he attended school in the Limburg city of Roermond, boarding with a family there and then he dropped out. In Roermond he attended lectures on Charles Darwin's new theory of evolution given by the German biologist, Carl Vogt.

Resisting his father's plan for him to train to follow in his footsteps, Dubois, encouraged by his teachers, decided in 1877 to study medicine at the University of Amsterdam. While a student, he taught anatomy at both of the brand new (founded 1880) art schools housed at the Rijksmuseum Amsterdam (Amsterdam State Museum) the Rijksschool voor Kunstnijverheid (State School for Applied Arts) and the Rijksnormaalschool voor Teekenonderwijzers (State Normal School for Drawing Instructors). In 1884 he completed his medical degree. He declined an offer from the University of Utrecht of a position as a docent. Instead, at the invitation of his anatomy instructor, Max Fürbringer, he decided to train as an academic. From 1881 to 1887 he studied comparative anatomy and became Fürbringer's assistant. In 1885 he investigated the larynx of vertebrates, which led him to develop a hypothesis of the evolution of this organ. Nevertheless, his chief interest was in human evolution, influenced by Ernst Haeckel, who reasoned that there must be intermediate species between ape and human.

Dubois contributed an article on whale anatomy to a book by the Dutch zoologist, Max Weber, and, inspired by the fresh discovery of new Neanderthal fossils at the Belgian town of Spy, he spent his vacation fossil hunting in the vicinity of his birthplace. In the Henkeput near the village of Rijckholt, where a prehistoric flint mine had just been discovered in 1881, he found some prehistoric human skulls.

Reasoning that the origins of the human species must be in the tropics, in 1887 he joined the Dutch army and arranged to be posted in the Dutch East Indies (the Dutch colony that is now independent Indonesia), to the dismay of his academic colleagues. With his wife and newborn daughter he moved to the colony to search for the missing link in human evolution. (He was unalterably convinced there was only one missing link.)

Hominid discoveries 
Between 1887 and 1895, Dubois searched at potential sites near rivers and in caves, first on the island of Sumatra, then on the Indonesian island of Java.

In 1891, Dubois discovered remains of what he described as "a species in between humans and apes". He called his finds Pithecanthropus erectus ("ape-human that stands upright") or Java Man. Today, they are classified as Homo erectus ("human that stands upright"). These were the first specimens of early hominid remains to be found outside of Africa or Europe. During this period Dubois carried out fieldwork at sites such as Sangiran in Central Java and Trinil in East Java.

Later years 
In 1897, the University of Amsterdam awarded Dubois an honorary doctorate in botany and zoology, but he had to wait until 1899 for a professorship. In that year, he was appointed a professor in geology, a function that did not keep him from his research in anatomy. He was also (from 1897 until 1928) keeper of paleontology, geology and mineralogy at Teylers Museum, where he also kept the H. erectus remains.

In 1919 he became member of the Royal Netherlands Academy of Arts and Sciences.

Although the scientific debate slowly began to turn in his favour in the 1920s and 1930s, he died embittered in 1940. He was buried in unconsecrated ground on the 16th of December 1940 in Venlo, "Algemene Begraafplaats", grave number NH2\26\-\BR.

Legacy 
His paleontological collection and scientific archive remain at Naturalis in Leiden. The institute dedicated an exhibition to his findings of Homo erectus in their renovated museum, where the holotype Trinil 2 is on display. According to Pat Shipman, adjunct professor of anthropology at Pennsylvania State University, Dubois was "an extremely influential person in founding paleo-anthropology. He not only found the fossils. He analyzed them in wholly new ways. He pulled human fossils out of this context of racial identification and shoved it into an evolutionary context and that was a real revolution." A special section of Museum Het Ursulinenconvent - International Museum for Family History is devoted to Dubois' life and work. Asteroid 206241 Dubois, discovered by the NEAT program in 2002, was named in his memory. The official  was published by the Minor Planet Center on 7 June 2009.

See also 

 List of fossil sites (with link directory)
 List of hominina (hominid) fossils (with images)
 International Museum for Family History

References 
 

 Morwood, Mike, and van Oosterzee, Penny. 2007. A new human: the startling discovery and strange story of the "hobbits" of Flores, Indonesia. Smithsonian Books.

Further reading
Pat Shipman, The Man who Found the Missing Link. Eugène Dubois and His Lifelong Quest to Prove Darwin Right, Harvard University Press (April 30, 2002), 528 pages, .

External links
 
 DUBOIS - The Quest for the Missing Link, www.eugenedubois.eu
 Biographies: Eugene Dubois at TalkOrigins Archive
 https://web.archive.org/web/20180903062402/http://www.cryingvoice.com/Evolution/ApeMen2.html
 Fossil Hominids, Human Evolution: Thomas Huxley & Eugene Dubois at www.understandingevolution.org

1858 births
1940 deaths
20th-century Dutch geologists
Dutch paleontologists
Dutch anatomists
Dutch anthropologists
Paleoanthropologists
Members of the American Philosophical Society
Members of the Royal Netherlands Academy of Arts and Sciences
People from Eijsden-Margraten
19th-century Dutch anatomists
20th-century Dutch anatomists
19th-century Dutch geologists
University of Amsterdam alumni
Dutch people of Walloon descent